Zhao Tao (born 5 May 1987) is a male Olympic medley swimmer from China. He swam for China at the:
Olympics: 2004
World Championships: 2003, 2007
World University Games: 2005
Asian Championships: 2006

References

1987 births
Living people
Chinese male medley swimmers
Swimmers from Anhui
Olympic swimmers of China
Swimmers at the 2004 Summer Olympics
Universiade medalists in swimming
Universiade bronze medalists for China
Medalists at the 2005 Summer Universiade